The teams competing in Group 6 of the 2004 UEFA European Under-21 Championships qualifying competition were Spain, Ukraine, Greece, Northern Ireland and Armenia.

Standings

Matches
All times are CET.

Goalscorers
5 goals
 Dimitrios Papadopoulos

3 goals
 Valdo

2 goals

 Warren Feeney
 Rubén Castro
 Jorge Larena
 Javier Portillo
 Fernando Torres
 Oleksiy Byelik
 Serhiy Danylovskyi

1 goal

 Vahe Davtyan
 Edgar Manucharyan
 Arsen Meloyan
 Karen Muradyan
 Levon Pachajyan
 Georgios Fotakis
 Panagiotis Lagos
 Dimitris Salpingidis
 Spyros Vallas
 Loukas Vyntra
 Chris Baird
 Kevin Braniff
 Hugh Davey
 Lee McEvilly
 Terry McFlynn
 Ciarán Toner
 Joseba Arriaga
 Mikel Arteta
 Oleh Husyev
 Taras Kabanov
 Vitaliy Lysytskyi
 Bohdan Shershun

1 own goal

 Valeri Aleksanyan (playing against Spain)
 Artur Petrosyan (playing against Spain)
 Tony Capaldi (playing against Spain)

External links
 Group 6 at UEFA.com

Group 6
Under
Under
Under